Abbott may refer to:

People
Abbott (surname)
Abbott Handerson Thayer (1849–1921), American painter and naturalist
Abbott and Costello, famous American vaudeville act

Places

Argentina
 Abbott, Buenos Aires

United States
 Abbott, Arkansas
 Abbott, Mississippi
 Abbott, Nebraska
 Abbott, Texas
 Abbott, Virginia
 Abbott, West Virginia
 Abbott Township, Potter County, Pennsylvania

Companies
 Abbott Laboratories, an American health care and medical devices company
 Abbott Records, a former American record label
 E. D. Abbott Ltd, an English maker of car bodies between 1929 and 1972

Other uses
 Abbott-Detroit, an American luxury automobile
 Abbott's Get Together, a magic convention held in Michigan
 Abbott 33, a Canadian sailboat design
 Abbott House (childcare agency), an American human services agency

See also
 Justice Abbott (disambiguation)
 Abbot, an ecclesiastical title
 Abbot (disambiguation)
 
 

nl:Abt